Dellaventura is an American crime drama television series created by Richard Di Lello, Julian Neil and Bernard L. Nussbaumer, that aired on CBS from September 23, 1997, to January 13, 1998.  The show was based on the life of late NYPD detective Anthony Dellaventura.

Premise
A former NYPD detective now works as a private detective, taking on cases in which the bureaucratic legal system has failed.

Cast
Danny Aiello as Anthony Dellaventura
Rick Aiello as Teddy Naples
Byron Keith Minns as Jonas Deeds
Anne Ramsay as Geri Zarias

Episodes

Reception

Dellaventura was described as "essentially a rip-off" of The Equalizer.

A review in the TV Guide noted:

References

External links

1997 American television series debuts
1998 American television series endings
1990s American crime drama television series
American detective television series
English-language television shows
CBS original programming
Television shows set in New York City